Sakhavu is a 1986 Indian Malayalam film, directed by K. S. Gopalakrishnan and produced by Edappazhinji Velappan Nair. The film stars Unnimary, Anuradha, Bheeman Raghu and Ramu in the lead roles. The film has musical score by V. D. Rajappan.

Cast
Unnimary
Anuradha
Bheeman Raghu
Ramu

Soundtrack
The music was composed by V. D. Rajappan and the lyrics were written by Kallayam Krishnadas and Panthalam Sudhakaran.

References

External links
 

1986 films
1980s Malayalam-language films
Films directed by K. S. Gopalakrishnan